Sword Health is a health care company that provides virtual and digital physical therapy. Founded in Portugal in 2015 by Virgílio Bento and Márcio Colunas, Sword Health is a startup company valued at $2 billion in November 2021.

History 
Sword Health was founded in 2015 by Virgílio Bento and Márcio Colunas.

Sword Health first rolled out commercially in the United States in January 2020. In November 2021, the company employed about 60 doctors of physical therapy. The company’s services are sold to employers who offer them to employees as a benefit.

See also 

 List of unicorn startup companies
 Telerehabilitation
 List of digital therapeutics companies

References

External links 

 Official website

Health care companies based in New York (state)
Telerehabilitation
Portuguese companies established in 2015
Health care companies established in 2015